WOGX (channel 51) is a television station licensed to Ocala, Florida, United States (in the Orlando market), but primarily serving the Gainesville area as a Fox network outlet. Owned and operated by the network's Fox Television Stations division, the station maintains an advertising sales office on Northwest 53rd Avenue in Gainesville and a transmitter in unincorporated Marion County, between Williston and Fairfield.

Although identifying as a separate station in its own right, WOGX is actually considered a semi-satellite of WOFL (channel 35) in Orlando. As such, it clears all network programming as provided through its parent station and simulcasts most of WOFL's newscasts, but airs a separate offering of syndicated programming; there are also separate local commercials and legal station identifications. WOGX's master control, as well as most internal operations, are housed at the shared studios of WOFL and MyNetworkTV O&O WRBW (channel 65) on Skyline Drive in Lake Mary.

Gainesville is by far the smallest designated market area in the U.S. with a "Big Four" network O&O. The Gainesville television market is located between several other Florida media markets. As a result, the Cox and Charter Spectrum systems in Marion County (which includes Ocala) do not carry WOGX but opt instead for WOFL, despite Ocala being WOGX's city of license. In addition, the Comcast Xfinity system in Marion County carries WOFL's HD signal on its digital tier in lieu of one from WOGX.

History
The station began as independent station WBSP-TV on November 1, 1983. The original owners, Big Sun Television, sold WBSP to Wabash Valley Broadcasting of Terre Haute, Indiana, in 1986; the new owners changed the call letters to the current WOGX in 1987. The previous calls now belong to a repeater of Fort Myers Univision affiliate WUVF-LP.

On May 30, 1991, the station became a Fox affiliate. Prior to then, Gainesville did not have a Fox affiliate of its own. Cox's Gainesville system didn't carry any of the nearest Fox affiliates—WOFL, Tampa Bay's WTOG (through 1988 when Fox moved to WFTS-TV, now an ABC affiliate), or Jacksonville's WAWS (now WFOX-TV). Marion County, home to Ocala, had received Fox programming through WOFL and WTOG (until 1988). Citrus County (which is part of the Tampa Bay market, but has long been claimed by WOGX as part of its primary coverage area) received Fox from W49AI (now WYKE-CD), which at the time was a repeater of WOFL (except for late night programming as W49AI signed off at midnight). W49AI was forced to discontinue Fox and WOFL programming upon WOGX's affiliation.

Channel 51 struggled for most of its first decade on the air, as Gainesville was not large enough for the station to be viable on its own. This was true even after the switch to Fox; until the network began airing a full week's worth of programming in 1994, most Fox stations were essentially programmed as independents. Finally, in 1996, Wabash Valley Broadcasting sold WOGX to the Meredith Corporation, owner of WOFL. Meredith turned WOGX into a semi-satellite of WOFL, and closed down WOGX's separate facility on Southwest 37th Avenue in Ocala (along I-75). While Meredith retained a separate sales office for WOGX in Gainesville, most operations were merged at WOFL's studios in Lake Mary. In 2002, Meredith sold WOFL and WOGX to Fox Television Stations in a deal that also saw Meredith obtain KPTV in Portland, Oregon. This made WOFL and WOGX both Fox owned-and-operated stations as well as sister to WRBW (then a UPN affiliate).

Sometime in late 2009, the station redesigned its website to match other Fox-owned stations (including WOFL); it never took up FTS's defunct 'myfox(community).com' web address standard outside of redirects from 'myfoxocala' and 'myfoxgainesville' to its standard callsign-inspired address to prevent cybersquatting.

Until WNBW-DT signed on, WOGX was the only commercial television station in the Gainesville–Ocala market to never have changed its affiliation.

On December 14, 2017, The Walt Disney Company, owner of ABC (affiliated network of WCJB-TV, channel 20), announced its intent to buy WOGX's parent company, 21st Century Fox, for $66.1 billion; the sale, which closed on March 20, 2019, excluded WOGX and Orlando sister stations WOFL and WRBW as well as the Fox network, the MyNetworkTV programming service, Fox News, Fox Sports 1 and the Fox Television Stations unit, which were all transferred to the newly-formed Fox Corporation.

Aborted trade to Sinclair Broadcast Group
On December 6, 2017, it was reported that Fox considered trading WOFL and WOGX to Sinclair Broadcast Group in exchange for some larger market Fox affiliates from Sinclair in NFL markets, as part of Sinclair's larger deal to acquire Tribune Media. This would have made the station a sister station to WGFL, WNBW, and their various low-powered sister stations. Since Sinclair doesn't own either WGFL or WNBW outright, it would have been able to own WOGX while continuing to operate WGFL and WNBW under a master service agreement, leaving WCJB-TV as the only commercial network station in the market not operated by Sinclair. However, on May 9, 2018, Fox officially announced which television stations it would purchase from Sinclair. The deal gave Sinclair the option to acquire Fox stations KTBC in Austin, Texas, as well as WFLD in Chicago. This meant that WOGX, along with WOFL, would not be sold to Sinclair and would remain Fox owned-and-operated stations. The Tribune Media deal was aborted in full on August 9, 2018, effectively also making their side deals with Fox Television Stations fully moot.

Programming

Syndicated programming
Syndicated programming currently shown on WOGX includes Live with Kelly and Ryan, The People's Court, The Big Bang Theory, and Law & Order: Special Victims Unit among others.

News operation
WOGX presently broadcasts 57½ hours of locally produced newscasts each week (with 9½ hours each weekday and five hours each on Saturdays and Sundays). All newscasts are simulcast from WOFL, with coverage focused on the Orlando metro area.

Although there is a separate title open seen on WOGX (branded as Fox 51 News) and its own channel "bug" in the bottom left-hand corner of the screen during all WOFL news simulcasts, there are no separate local inserts targeted to the Gainesville–Ocala area since there are no news-related personnel based out of WOGX's facility. WOFL does, however, provide regional coverage (such as sports events at the University of Florida) when conditions warrant or during severe weather coverage (i.e. a tornado warning).

WOGX began simulcasting WOFL's newscasts when its news department launched in March 1998. Since September 2022, it clears all newscasts from the Orlando station, with the weeknight 11:00 p.m. news (Fox 35 NewsEdge - 11 at 11:00 and Fox 35 SportsZone) becoming the last newscast to be added to WOGX. The 9:00 a.m. Good Day Xtra weekday morning hour was not originally a part of it, but WOGX subsequently added that. It has also started to carry the hour-long weeknight 6:00 p.m. news and even the weekend morning edition of Good Day Orlando from 8:00 to 10:00 a.m. from WOFL.

Technical information

Subchannels
The station's digital signal is multiplexed:

Analog-to-digital conversion
WOGX discontinued regular programming on its analog signal, over UHF channel 51, on June 12, 2009, the official date in which full-power television stations in the United States transitioned from analog to digital broadcasts under federal mandate. The station's digital signal remained on its pre-transition UHF channel 31. Through the use of PSIP, digital television receivers display the station's virtual channel as its former UHF analog channel 51.

References

External links

 – WOFL

OGX
Movies! affiliates
Ion Television affiliates
Fox network affiliates
Fox Television Stations
Television channels and stations established in 1983
1983 establishments in Florida